Thiruvambadi Sri Krishna Temple is a Hindu temple in the city of Thrissur in Kerala, India. The main deities of this temple are Krishna in the form of a child, and Bhadrakali, both having equal importance. There are sub-shrines for Ganesha, Sastha and Brahmarakshas, and there is a sub-temple for Ganesha behind the temple. The temple is one of the two rival groups participating in the Thrissur Pooram.

The temple was home to an elephant named Thiruvambadi Sivasundar who died in 2018.

See also
 Temples of Kerala
 Paramekkavu Bagavathi Temple 
 Thiruvambady in Kozhikode
 Thiruvambadi Sivasundar
 Thiruvambadi Chandrasekharan
 Thiruvambadi Cheriya Chandrasekharan

External links

 

Krishna temples
Hindu temples in Thrissur district
Thrissur Pooram